Nataša Ninković (born 22 July 1972) is a Serbian actress, best known for her roles in the films Savior, War Live, The Professional and The Trap.

Personal life 
Ninković was born on 22 July 1972 in Trebinje (SFR Yugoslavia then, Bosnia and Herzegovina now) to father Branko and mother Milena. She finished her primary and secondary school in Trebinje. In 1994, Ninković graduated at the Faculty of Drama Arts at the University of Belgrade, along with actors Vojin Ćetković, Sergej Trifunović and Nebojša Glogovac.

Ninković is married to Nenad Šarenac, with whom she has twins Luka and Matija Šarenac.

Filmography

Awards and nominations

References

External links 
 

1972 births
20th-century Serbian writers
21st-century Serbian writers
20th-century Serbian actresses
21st-century Serbian actresses
Living people
Actresses from Belgrade
People from Trebinje
Serbian film actresses
Serbian people of Bosnia and Herzegovina descent
Serbs of Bosnia and Herzegovina
Serbian stage actresses
Serbian television actresses
Serbian screenwriters
Serbian voice actresses
Žanka Stokić award winners
University of Belgrade Faculty of Dramatic Arts alumni